Leilani McGonagle (born 14 November 1999) is a Costa Rican professional surfer who competes in the World Surf League. Her brother Noe Mar McGonagle is also a professional surfer.

Early life 
She was born to American father and British mother. She was identified to be diagnosed with scoliosis after her birth. Before she could walk, her parents pushed her into her first wave. Her father was also a surfer who grew up engaging in the sport of surfing in San Clemente. Her father later moved from United States to Costa Rica after finishing his studies at the high school.

Career 
During her junior career, she emerged as a North American junior champion. She was adjudged as the Surfer of the Year at the Costa Rica Surfing Awards in 2016 and 2017.

She qualified to the 2020 Summer Olympics following her performance at the 2021 ISA World Surfing Games. Incidentally, surfing was included for the first time in Olympics for the Tokyo Games. She dedicated her Olympic qualification achievement to her friend and Salvadoran surfer Katherine Díaz Hernández who died in early 2021 due to lightning.

She represented Costa Rica at the 2020 Summer Olympics which also marked her debut appearance at the Olympics. She was eliminated from the round 2 of the women's shortboard event.

References 

1999 births
Living people
Costa Rican surfers
World Surf League surfers
Surfers at the 2020 Summer Olympics
Olympic surfers of Costa Rica
Costa Rican people of American descent
Female surfers